
Line 11 of the Madrid Metro is a rapid transit line in Madrid, Spain.

History

For the line's first eight years of existence, there were just three stations.

Future
Line 11 was projected to ultimately become one of the longest lines in Madrid according to plans of the regional government in 2005.

The project to expand the line north and south was reimagined in 2020. The final form is projected to become a large 'Diagonal' which would connect 11 of the 12 lines of the metro. The new line is expected to extend to the south, to Cuatro Vientos in the south (connecting with Line 10). From the northeast, it will lead through the city centre, connecting all the lines at the East via a semicircular trajectory, then reaching the Barajas Airport and the new Hospital Isabel Zendal (built during the COVID-19 pandemic) and finally ending in the Valdebebas new urban development. It has been pointed out that this expansion would alleviate the comparatively lacking interconnectedness of the outward lines, leading to shorter commutes and a declogging of the often overloaded circular Line 6.

Works on the next section from Plaza Elíptica to Conde de Casal is scheduled to begin in November 2022, with the other sections scheduled to begin construction in 2024. The full extension is scheduled for completion by the second quarter of 2027.

Rolling stock
Line 11 uses four-car trains of CAF class 8000 large rolling stock since the opening of the  extension. Before that, the line used class 3000 trainsets.

Stations

See also
 Madrid
 Transport in Madrid
 List of Madrid Metro stations
 List of metro systems

References

External links

  Madrid Metro (official website)
 Schematic map of the Metro network – from the official site 
 Madrid at UrbanRail.net
 ENGLISH User guide, ticket types, airport supplement and timings
 Network map (real-distance)
 Madrid Metro Map

11
Railway lines opened in 1998
1998 establishments in Spain